Willow Creek is a major north-flowing stream in Utah, United States, and is a tributary of the Green River. The creek drains a large remote area of the East Tavaputs Plateau, flowing into the Green River south of Ouray.

Geography
East Willow Creek is joined by She Canyon before combining with West Willow Creek to form the main stem. From there, Willow Creek flows northward into Uintah County, through the Uintah and Ouray Indian Reservation, across the East Tavaputs Plateau at the bottom of a rugged gorge. It receives several major tributaries from the east, including Meadow Creek, Main Canyon, and Sunday School Canyon. Below Sunday School Canyon, Willow Creek flows through a wider valley along the east side of Big Pack Mountain to its confluence with Hill Creek, its largest tributary. Above their confluence, Hill Creek is almost the same length as Willow Creek, flowing roughly parallel and several miles to the west of Willow Creek.

There are no dams on Willow Creek, but there is one dam on Hill Creek, forming Towave Reservoir. Willow Creek is used for agriculture, mainly livestock water supply. The creek has high levels of dissolved solids and is considered an impaired water body.

See also
 List of rivers of Utah
 List of tributaries of the Colorado River

References

External links

Rivers of Utah
Rivers of Grand County, Utah
Tributaries of the Green River (Colorado River tributary)
Tributaries of the Colorado River in Utah